The Kruostas is a river of Kėdainiai district municipality, Kaunas County, central Lithuania. It originates next to Pakruostė, then runs to the Southeast for  till discharges into the Nevėžis river (from the right side) near Kalnaberžė village. Kalnaberžė hillfort stands at the confluence of the Kruostas and Nevėžis. 

The river passes through Pakruostėlė, Berželė and Kalnaberžė villages.

The name Kruostas derives from Lithuanian word kruostas or skruostas ('cheek, eyelash, eyebrow'), further from skrosti, skersti ('to slice, to butcher').

References

Rivers of Lithuania
Kėdainiai District Municipality